The eleventh season of the animated television series Archer debuted on FXX on September 16, 2020.

Production
The eleventh season was scheduled to premiere on May 6, 2020, but was postponed until September 16 amidst the COVID-19 pandemic.

The episode "Bloodsploosh" is dedicated to the memory of Ron Leibman, who died on December 6, 2019 from pneumonia at age 82 before this episode aired.

Synopsis 
The series begins with Archer waking up from his coma, returning to the real world of his activities as a spy. However, since he has been in a coma for three years, much has changed and Archer must adjust to it, albeit with much reluctance.

The series’ setting is once again New York, following the seventh season (the last season that was not a product of Archer’s coma dreams), which took place in Los Angeles.

Episodes

References

External links
 
 

2020 American television seasons
Archer (2009 TV series) seasons
Television productions postponed due to the COVID-19 pandemic